Siyabonga Msholozi Mdluli (born 26 August 1986) is an Eswatini footballer playing for Swazi Premier League side Green Mamba F.C.

Career
Siyabonga is the captain of Swaziland national football team. In the 2016 COSAFA Cup semifinals match against South Africa, his team was leading by 1-0 against half time, only for Siyabonga to get red carded for a foul on Judas Moseamedi. The South Africans prevailed 5-1 ultimately, and went on to become the champions in the final.

Siyabongo assaulted Royal Leopards F.C.'s Zweli ‘Mlilo’ Nxumalo during the second-leg semifinals of the 2015 Swazi Premier League. He later apologised for the incident.

References 

1986 births
Swazi footballers
Living people
Association football defenders
Eswatini international footballers